Tabor is a regional locality in Shire of Southern Grampians in the Western District of  Victoria, Australia named after Tábor in Bohemia now part of the Czech Republic.

A Lutheran church was built at Tabor in 1861. This building no longer exists, having been replaced in 1884 by a new church of bluestone construction. This was in turn replaced by the current bluestone church building in 1912.  The "second" church was turned into a primary school around that time, Victorian School number 84. The school was closed and de-registered in the early 1990s. A Post Office opened around 1905 though known for some time as Croxton East R(ailway)S(tation). It closed in 1952.

A cemetery is located in the grounds of the Tabor church precinct.

References

Towns in Victoria (Australia)